The following is an overview of Public housing estates in Cheung Sha Wan, Hong Kong, including Home Ownership Scheme (HOS), Green Form Subsidised Home Ownership Scheme (GFSHOS), Private Sector Participation Scheme (PSPS), and Tenants Purchase Scheme (TPS) estates.

History

Historians suggested there were inhabitants settled in this area during Eastern Han Dynasty ( 25 A.D-220 A.D ), as an Eastern Han tomb was discovered in the year 1955, the Eastern Han tomb now become Lee Cheng Uk Museum when Lee Cheng Uk Estate was built.

Overview

Cheung Sha Wan Estate

The original Cheung Sha Wan Estate opened between 1963 and 1964 as the Cheung Sha Wan Government Low Cost Housing Estate. It was renamed following the 1973 establishment of the Housing Authority. All thirteen blocks of this estate were demolished in 2001 as part of the Comprehensive Redevelopment Programme, announced 1995. Most displaced residents were moved to the nearby Fortune Estate.

A new estate opened in 2013 bearing the same name. It sits just north of the original Cheung Sha Wan Estate site, on the site of the former Cheung Sha Wan Police Married Quarters. It is made up of two public rental blocks and an auxiliary facilities block linked to Un Chau Estate by a walkway spanning Cheung Sha Wan Road.

The site of the original Cheung Sha Wan Estate was leased to the Asia Golf Club driving range. The golf club has since closed and a new public housing estate is under construction on the site. This new estate is called Lai Tsui Court.

Houses

Fortune Estate

Fortune Estate is located opposite to Un Chau Estate and near Cheung Sha Wan station. Formerly the site of Fortune Street Temporary Housing Area, the estate consists of three residential buildings built in 2001 to settle the residents affected by the redevelopment of Cheung Sha Wan Estate, Tai Hang Tung Estate and Un Chau Estate.

Houses

Hang Chun Court 

Hang Chun Court is a HOS court in Cheung Sha Wan, next to Fortune Estate. Like Fortune Estate, Hang Chun Court was formerly the site of Fortune Temporary Housing Area. It has two blocks built in 2001.

Houses 

Both houses were under lockdown for mandatory covid test on 26 February 2022.

Hoi Lai Estate

Hoi Lai Estate was built on the reclaimed land of south Cheung Sha Wan, near Lai Chi Kok station and four private housing estates, namely Aqua Marine, Banyan Garden, Liberté and The Pacifica. The estate consists of 12 residential buildings and a shopping centre completed between 2004 and 2005. It was planned for HOS court, but it was changed to rental housing before it was occupied.

Houses

Hoi Lok Court

Hoi Lok Court is a Home Ownership Scheme court in Lai Ying Street, Cheung Sha Wan reclaimed area of Sham Shui Po District near MTR Nam Cheong station and Hoi Ying Estate. It comprises five 40-to-42-storey blocks with totally 2,522 flats. The flats were sold in 2018 at prices from HK$2.17M to HK$4.68M, after the revision from the previous 70% of the market flat prices to 52% announced by Carrie Lam, Chief Executive of Hong Kong. The court completed in 2019.

Hoi Tak Court

Hoi Tak Court is a Home Ownership Scheme court in Fat Tseung Street West, Cheung Sha Wan reclaimed area of Sham Shui Po District, near MTR Nam Cheong station and Fu Cheong Estate. It comprises one block with totally 814 flats. It was arranged for sale in 2018 and is expected to complete in late 2020.

Lai Tsui Court

Lei Cheng Uk Estate

Lei Cheng Uk Estate is a mixed public and TPS estate in Lei Cheng Uk, downhill of Cheung Sha Wan near So Uk Estate. It is also adjacent to the Lei Cheng Uk Han Tomb Museum. Since the redevelopment in the 1980s, the estate consists of 10 residential buildings completed in 1984, 1989 and 1990 respectively. In 2002, some of the flats were sold to tenants through Tenants Purchase Scheme Phase 5. The estate is now managed by Hong Kong Housing Society.

Po Hei Court 

Po Hei Court is a HOS court in Cheung Sha Wan, next to Lei Cheng Uk Han Tomb Museum and Lei Cheng Uk Estate. It consists of 2 blocks built in 1993.

Houses

Po Lai Court 

Po Lai Court is a HOS court in Cheung Sha Wan, next to Po Hei Court. It consists of three blocks built in 1987.

Houses

So Uk Estate

So Uk Estate (Chinese: 蘇屋邨) is situated in the northern area So Uk, a downhill in Cheung Sha Wan. The estate was built alongside of squatter areas, which was later demolished for the construction of the estate of 16 blocks in 1960. Unlike many public housing estates built afterwards, the architectural design of the estates is unique in Hong Kong.  The "houses" were named after varieties of flowers. There are 5,316 flats in the estate, with capacity of 15,200. High maintenance cost made the Hong Kong Housing Authority decide to demolish it in 2008 and 2011 in two phases, and residents will be relocated to Un Chau Estate Phases 2, 4, and 5 in Sham Shui Po.

Un Chau Estate

Un Chau Estate, or Un Chau Street Estate, is a redeveloped public estate on reclaimed land of Cheung Sha Wan located between Un Chau Street and Cheung Sha Wan Road, next to Cheung Sha Wan station. It consists of 10 residential buildings completed in 1998, 1999 and 2008, which were developed into 4 phases. Phase 5 is under development on the site of former Cheung Sha Wan Factory Estate.

See also
Public housing in Hong Kong
List of public housing estates in Hong Kong

References

Cheung Sha Wan
 
 
 
Proposed infrastructure in Hong Kong